

Events

Works published

Births
 Guido Cavalcanti (died 1300), Italian poet

Deaths

13th-century poetry
Poetry